Olearia rosmarinifolia is a species of flowering plant in the family Asteraceae and is endemic to eastern Australia. It is a shrub with scattered linear leaves, and white and yellow, daisy-like inflorescences.

Description
The upper surface of the leaves is more or less glabrous, the lower surface covered with greyish, woolly hairs. Flowering occurs from October to December and the fruit is a glabrous achene, the pappus with 60 to 84 bristles.

Taxonomy
This daisy was first formally described in 1836 by Augustin Pyramus de Candolle who gave it the name Eurybia rosmarinifolia in his Prodromus Systematis Naturalis Regni Vegetabilis from specimens collected near Bathurst. In 1867, George Bentham changed the name to Olearia rosmarinifolia in Flora Australiensis. The specific epithet (rosmarinifolia) means "Rosmarinus-leaved".

Distribution and habitat
Olearia rosmarinifolia grows in rocky sites near rivers and in gorges from south-east Queensland and south to near Cooma in southern New South Wales.

References

rosmarinifolia
Asterales of Australia
Flora of New South Wales
Flora of Queensland
Plants described in 1836
Taxa named by Augustin Pyramus de Candolle